Agelena gautami is a species of spider in the family Agelenidae, which contains at least 1,315 species of funnel-weaver spiders . It was first described by Tikader in 1962. It is primarily found in India.

References

gautami
Spiders described in 1962
Spiders of the Indian subcontinent